Devrim (lit. Revolution in Turkish), was a weekly newspaper published in Ankara which was launched on 21 Ekim 1969. The owner was Cemal Reşit Eyuboğlu, and the director of publication was Doğan Avcıoğlu, who also wrote the editorials.

The newspaper sought to show that the contemporary understanding of democracy was simply a diversion. Instead, they proposed a 'national – revolutionary' administration in the direction of extra-parliamentary opposition. Hasan Cemal, one of the writers of the paper in his memoirs, Cumhuriyet'i Çok Sevmiştim, confessed that the purpose of such a policy was to convince nationalist officers in the military to stage a coup in the cause of 'National Democratic Revolution'.

The newspaper ceased publication on 27 April 1971 following the 1971 Turkish coup d'état.

References

1969 establishments in Turkey
1971 disestablishments in Turkey
Defunct weekly newspapers
Defunct newspapers published in Turkey
Mass media in Ankara
Publications established in 1969
Publications disestablished in 1971
Socialist newspapers
Turkish-language newspapers
Weekly newspapers published in Turkey